Colorado Blizzard may refer to:

Colorado Holiday Blizzards (2006–2007), major storms during late December 2006 in the Denver, Colorado, area
Colorado Springs Blizzard, a team in the USL Premier Development League